My Little Baby (Hangul: 마이 리틀 베이비) is a South Korean TV series, starring Oh Ji-ho, Lee Soo-kyung, Kim Min-jae and Nam Ji-hyun. The first episode was aired on March 5, 2016 on MBC.

Cast

Main Cast 
 Oh Ji-ho as Cha Jung-Han
 Lee Soo-kyung as Han Ye-Seul
 Kim Min-jae as Yoon Min
 Nam Ji-hyun as Han So-Yoon

Supporting Cast

Mom Community 
 Jung Soo-young as Jo Ji-Young
 Go Soo-hee as Kang Yoon-Sook
 Joo Sae-byuk as Kim Bo-Mi

Others 
 Yoo Na-rand as Seo Eun-Ae
 Hong Eun-taek as Kim Hoon-Goo
 Jang Hee-soo as Ma Jung-Soon
 Tae Hang-ho as Seo Jang-Hoon
 Kim Sung-gi as Han Sa-Jang
 Seo Woo-jin as (Supporting)
 Kim Ha-yeon as Eun-ae, Cha Jung-han's daughter

Original Soundtracks

My Little Baby OST Part 1

My Little Baby OST Part 2

My Little Baby OST Part 3

Ratings 
Note: The blue color indicates lowest rating while  red color indicates highest rating.

Note: This drama airs two episodes back-to-back late at night and therefore has a relatively small audience compared to primetime dramas.

Rerun 
My Little Baby was rerun by MBC for three weeks from Oct. 23, 2017 to Nov. 10, 2017 in the morning drama time slot (Monday to Friday 7:50 a.m.), after the production of 120-episode drama Reverse, the replacement of Teacher Oh Soon-nam, was delayed.

Notes

References

External links

2016 South Korean television series debuts
South Korean comedy television series
2016 South Korean television series endings
MBC TV television dramas